The Salford Red Devils are a professional rugby league club in Salford, Greater Manchester, England, who play in the Super League. Formed in 1873, they have won six Championships and one Challenge Cup. Their home ground since 2012 has been the AJ Bell Stadium in Barton-upon-Irwell, before which they played at the Willows in Weaste. Before 1995, the club was known simply as Salford, from 1995 to 1998 Salford Reds and from 1999 to 2013 Salford City Reds.

History

Early years

The club was founded in 1873 by the boys of the Cavendish Street Chapel in Hulme, Manchester. Using a local field, the boys organised matches amongst themselves before moving to nearby Moss Side.

In an attempt to recruit new members, the link with the school was broken in 1875 and the name Cavendish Football Club was adopted. They moved to a new base on the Salford side of the River Irwell at Throstle Nest Weir in Ordsall. Two seasons later, they moved again to the west side of Trafford Road to a ground known as the Mile Field where they spent the 1877–78 season. Their next home was a field north of the former Manchester Racecourse, New Barnes. Their first season there, 1878–79, was the last to be played under the Cavendish name.

Cavendish became Salford Football Club in 1879. The first match as Salford was at Dewsbury on 4 October 1879. The following week heralded the first home match at New Barnes against Widnes, on 11 October 1879. The result was a draw with one try each.

Salford struggled to attract support as there were few local players in the team. In 1881, they almost disbanded but instead merged with the Crescent Football Club. This placed Salford firmly on the rugby map, it was an exciting period and, during the remaining 15 years as members of the Rugby Football Union, seventeen Salford players were selected for Lancashire, three by the North of England and two, Harry Eagles and Tom Kent, for England. Since the 1881 merger, only 62 matches were lost from 263 played in the remaining nine years of the decade.

In 1889, Salford moved their headquarters to the nearby London and North Western Hotel on Cross Lane. Salford switched from their traditional amber, black and scarlet hoops to red jerseys. The club became the first side to win the Lancashire League in 1892–93.

Salford along with Leigh and Wigan, were suspended for professionalism by the Rugby Football Union in 1895, and placed joint bottom of the Lancashire league. With automatic promotion and relegation, they faced dropping down a division, and potential financial ruin. That same year, the leading Lancashire and Yorkshire clubs formed the breakaway Northern Union, Salford initially remained loyal to the Rugby Football Union but in April 1896 Salford held a special meeting to discuss joining the new organisation. Only three members opposed the motion.

Salford were admitted to the Northern Union on 2 June 1896. Their first competitive Northern Union match was on Saturday, 5 September 1896, with a visit to Widnes. The Reds, competing in the Lancashire Senior Competition, lost 10–0, and only three matches were won in the League that season. Their form improved and they finished third place in 1898–99. In 1900, Salford met old local rivals, Swinton, in the Rugby League Challenge Cup Final at Fallowfield, Manchester. After a keenly fought contest, the result was a 16–8 win for Swinton.

20th century
In 1900, Salford received notice to vacate New Barnes as the Manchester Ship Canal Company had purchased the land. Salford made their début at the Willows on 21 December 1901, beating Swinton 2–0, the official attendance reaching 16,981. James Lomas became rugby league's first £100 transfer, from Bramley to Salford in 1901.

The club continued making progress in the Rugby League Challenge Cup, reaching the semi-final stages in 1902, 1903, 1906, 1907 and 1910. On three occasions, they succeeded in reaching the final, but lost 0–25 to Broughton Rangers in 1902, 0–7 to Halifax in 1903 and 0–5 to Bradford in 1906. The Championship also proved elusive, the Reds finishing runners-up for three consecutive seasons from 1901 to 1902. In the last of those, Salford and Bradford finished level on points with Salford having the superior scoring record. Despite that, the Reds had to take part in a deciding match at Halifax, which they lost 5–0.

The Kiwis, then known as the All Golds, visited in 1907, and Salford played them on 28 December, losing 9–2 in front of a reported 9,000 spectators. Lance Todd, who was to have such an influence at the Willows 20 years later, was in the New Zealanders' side. A year later, the Australians stopped off at the Willows on 17 October. The result was a 9–9 draw.

Salford won the Rugby Football League Championship in 1913–14. The club had financial problems and was in the hands of the official receiver but somehow in the Championship final, beat Huddersfield's "Team of All Talents" 5–3 on 25 April 1914, this was the club's first major honour.

In August 1914, the Salford Football Club Company was finally wound up and a new company, Salford Football Club (1914) Limited was formed. During the First World War, Salford continued to function, but it was a struggle. Thirty-two Salford players volunteered for the war, of which seven were killed.

The 1920s was an era of survival, on and off the field, the team opening the decade with their worst ever league placing, finishing last in 1920–21. There was a dramatic change of fortune during the summer of 1928 when Lance Todd became team manager. In his first season in charge (1928–29), "Toddy's Toddlers" went from 26th to fourth place in the table with virtually the same set of players.

Gus Risman was talent-spotted by Lance Todd, when he was 17 years old. He made his début for Salford on 31 August 1929. Other legendary names included Alan Edwards, Jack Feetham, Barney Hudson, Emlyn Jenkins, Billy Watkins and Billy Williams.

Salford were considered the leading club in the game during the 1930s, winning three League Championships, five Lancashire League Championships, four Lancashire Cups and the Rugby League Challenge Cup.

Salford won the Lancashire Cup for the first time in 1931 by beating Swinton 10–8 at the Cliff in front of a crowd of 26,471. Having been runners-up in the same competition in 1929 it was their first trophy for 17 years.

Salford captured the Rugby League Championship in 1933 by beating Swinton 15–5 in the final at Central Park, Wigan.

Salford were the first club to be invited to tour France who saw them as the premier side in the game. Their trip in October and November 1934 was to promote rugby league in the country. They won all six matches in spectacular fashion and were given their unofficial nickname; Les Diables Rouges (The Red Devils) by French journalists. The opening game was in Paris on Sunday 21 October, following an overnight ferry journey, having beaten Wigan 21–12 in the Lancashire Cup final the previous afternoon.

Salford turned its attention to baseball during the summer of 1935 as members of the National Baseball League. Matches were staged at the Willows. Several of Salford's players took part including Gus Risman. The team was called the Salford Reds.

In 1936, for a third consecutive year, Salford won the Lancashire Cup, defeating Wigan 5–2 at Wilderspool, Warrington.

Salford's highest attendance was set on 13 February 1937 when 26,470 turned up to watch Salford versus Warrington in the first round of the Rugby League Challenge Cup. The 1937 Australian touring team was beaten by Salford 11–8 at the Willows. Despite heavy rain that created muddy playing conditions, 12,000 attended.

Salford beat Barrow 7–4 in the final of the 1938 Challenge Cup at Wembley, the club's first-ever win. A famous photograph was taken of Gus Risman and the cup being carried shoulder-high round the stadium by his teammates with him being the only one without a cigarette in his hand.

In 1939, Salford became the first rugby league club to make successive visits to Wembley but were well beaten 20–3 by Halifax. On 3 September 1939, the Second World War began and the 1939–40 season was abandoned. A wartime Emergency League was organised but, at the beginning of January 1941, Salford decided to cease playing, due to poor gates. In November 1942, Lance Todd was killed in a car crash.

Post war
On 25 August 1945, Salford played their first match after the war against Castleford, winning 10–0 at the Willows. Hundreds of supporters gave up their summer weekends to help put the derelict looking ground back into good order.

In 1946, Salford appeared to be on their way to a third consecutive peacetime final, but Salford lost, unexpectedly, at home to Hunslet (15–8) at the quarter-final stage. In the second post-war season, 1946–47, Salford slid to twenty-second, a dramatic climb followed and the team finished seventh in 1948–49, and fifth in 1949–50. But it was a false dawn and the team fell into mid-table obscurity during the 1950s.

In 1950, Salford finished fifth on scoring difference to miss out on a top-4 play-off spot but it was their highest post-war finish until 1973–74.

Salford lost 4–8 to Warrington in a third-round Challenge Cup tie on 17 March 1951 at the Willows. The crowd was reported in the press as 28,000, the upper limit that had been set for the match. If correct it would be a ground record, but no official figure survives to confirm the exact attendance.

Salford won a four-team summer competition at Stanley Park in Blackpool 1952. Staged as part of Blackpool Corporation's Festival of Sport Fortnight, the Reds eliminated Barrow in the semi-final and then defeated Doncaster 26–7 in the final.

When Gus Risman quit as a player in 1954, he coached Salford for four years, before moving temporarily to Phoenix, Arizona (USA) to care for his nephew who had recently been involved in a dog mauling incident.

Saturday 26 November 1955 saw television cameras at the Willows for the first time when the second half of the match against New Zealand was broadcast live on BBC Grandstand.

Salford hosted their first floodlit game, using Manchester United's ground on Wednesday 5 November 1958 against Leeds in a match postponed from October. Leeds won 22–17.

A proposal in 1960 to create a Manchester rugby league club at the former White City Stadium on Chester Road received strong opposition from Salford and Swinton. Their protests were renewed when a match was staged there between a Manchester XIII, drawn from both Salford and Swinton and the New Zealand tourists in September 1961 and the idea was subsequently dropped.

Gus Risman returned to Salford as team manager in February 1962.

Between March and September 1962, Salford hit an all-time low with 19 consecutive defeats. Covering two seasons, it is the worst run in the club's history. Salford also suffered what was then their largest margin of defeat, when they lost 59–0 at St. Helens.

Brian Snape era
Brian Snape succeeded Jim Hammond as chairman in September 1963. Snape appointed Griff Jenkins as secretary-coach in 1964, and the Reds immediately started to climb the league ladder.

Salford built a variety club in 1966 in a bid to attract couples and parties to attend rugby matches. Between 1967 and 1972, Salford averaged over 7,000 spectators at a time when the league average was slipping below 2,000. In June 1967 the Willows switched on its floodlights for the first time in the match with Widnes on Friday 11 March 1966. From that evening, Friday night was rugby league night as the fans flocked to the Willows.

In October 1967 David Watkins joined Salford for £15,000, a then club record. Watkins scored in 92 consecutive matches for Salford from 19 August 1972 to 25 April 1974. He totalled 929 points from 41 tries and 403 goals.

In 1967, the Rugby Football League gave permission for games to be played on Sunday for the first time. The Willows staged its first Sunday fixture, a friendly with French club, Cavaillon, on 5 May 1968. It was not until the following season that the Reds were at home in their first competitive Sunday match, a second-round Challenge Cup-tie against Workington Town on 23 February 1969, Salford winning 12–5, destined for their third Wembley final which they lost 11–6 to Castleford, it was their first visit to Wembley after a gap of 30 years.

Salford's red devil nickname was immortalized when local football team Manchester United decided to replace their "Busby's Babes" nickname following the Munich crash. Matt Busby liked the sound of "Red Devils", thinking a devil was more intimidating to opponents than angelic babes and Manchester United adopted the "Red Devils" nickname.

In 1969, the BBC documentary, the Game That Got Away, held up Salford's revenue model as a blueprint for other clubs to follow.

In 1971, Salford beat the New Zealand tourists for the first time after five previous defeats.

In October 1972, Salford reached the final of the Lancashire County Cup for the first time since 1938, beating Swinton 25–11 at Wilderspool, Warrington to win their first trophy in thirty-three years. Salford reached the next three Lancashire Cup finals but failed to recapture the cup in any of them. They were also runners-up to Leeds in the 1972–73 Players No.6 Trophy. In 1973–74 and 1975–76 the club claimed two Championships and won the 1974–75 BBC2 Floodlit Trophy. The 1974 Championship was their first since 1938–39.

Salford's last major final of the Brian Snape era was the 1976 Premiership Trophy decider played at Station Road, Swinton. Salford conceded three tries in the last 12 minutes to lose 15–2. As the 1970s drew to a close, many star players had retired or were approaching the veteran stage, with no funds available to replace them.

In the 1976–77 season, the Salford versus Leeds match was abandoned just after half-time, after Chris Sanderson of Leeds suffered a fatal injury, after 38 minutes. Leeds were ahead 5–2, but the game was declared null and void and not replayed.

Stan McCormick was coach between February 1978 and March 1978. At the end of the 1977–78 season, Brian Snape left Salford, handing over the reins to his brother Keith.

Post Snape era
In May 1978, Alex Murphy was a surprise appointment as Salford coach. Years earlier he had famously referred to Salford's expensively built team as the 'Quality Street Gang'.

Salford's home league fixture with Widnes was designated as the club's 'Centenary Match' in October 1979. Watched by 11,982, the result was 16–16, Salford playing in their original jersey colours of red, amber and black hoops. In fact Salford was founded in 1873 as Cavendish, changing their name to Salford in 1879. Alex Murphy left in November 1980, he was replaced by Kevin Ashcroft.

By the end of the 1970s, the variety centre was losing money and in 1980, it was sold to the brewery Greenall Whitley. In 1981, Salford reverted to playing on Sunday afternoons.

On 3 January 1982, John Wilkinson took over as chairman. Wilkinson inherited a club living above its income, forcing him to make cost-saving measures. Mike Coulman coached Salford for the 1983–84 season.

Between July–August 1986, Salford participated in an 8-a-side touch rugby competition that included most of the senior clubs. The Reds won after beating Featherstone Rovers in the final at Elland Road, Leeds.

While the books were being balanced, steady progress was made on it, the Reds pulling off a major coup with the signing of Australian full-back Garry Jack in 1988. The Lancashire Cup final was reached in 1988, the Reds losing narrowly to favourites Wigan.

Kevin Tamati became coach in 1989. 1990 turned out to be a golden year. Salford won the Second Division Championship, losing just one game all season. In the Premiership final in front of 50,000 at Old Trafford, the Red Devils beat Halifax 27–20. They also made the final of the Lancashire Cup, losing narrowly to favourites Widnes.

In 1993 Garry Jack became head coach and manager as Tamati left. Jack was relieved from the coaching duties before being sacked as club manager in early 1995.

Summer era
In 1996, the first tier of British rugby league clubs played the inaugural Super League season and changed from a winter to a summer season. Andy Gregory had finished his playing days as player-coach at Salford in 1995. Salford finished with 21 points; six-points clear of Hull F.C. and seemingly safe from a drop into the lower leagues. However, the Rupert Murdoch-funded Super League competition proposed, as part of the deal, that some traditional clubs would merge. Salford were to merge with Oldham to form a Manchester club that would compete in Super League. When Salford visited Oldham for a match on Good Friday, 14 April, supporters of both clubs demonstrated against the idea by invading the pitch during the interval. This merger was resisted but Salford were not included in the new competition.

Salford added Reds to their name for the 1995–96 season. In 1996 Salford beat Wigan 26–16 at the Willows to produce one of the Challenge Cup's biggest shocks. It brought to an end a record run of eight successive Wembley victories by Wigan. Salford went on to reclaim their place in Super League by edging out Keighley to win the First Division.

Gregory left Salford by mutual consent in May 1999 to concentrate on his pub business in Wigan. John Harvey replaced him as head coach.  Salford Reds became Salford City Reds in 1999 reportedly because Salford Council wanted their financial support for the club to be recognised, so their name was changed to emphasise the city status of Salford. The club's first match as Salford City Reds took place against Gateshead at the Willows on 18 July 1999. After the club avoided relegation at the end of the 1999 season, Harvey was given a contract for a further season. He resigned in July 2001 following a 70–4 defeat at Wigan.

Steve McCormack became the youngest Super League coach at the age of just 28 in 2001 but was sacked just 10 months later, after winning only three of 20 games. He was replaced by Karl Harrison, who had been Assistant Coach to Brian Noble at Bradford Bulls.

Salford City Reds struggled in the 2002 season and Harrison was unable to keep the club in the Super League, despite a good end to the season. Indeed, they went into the final match of the season second from bottom (only the bottom club were relegated that season). However, a home defeat by Castleford, coupled with a home win for Wakefield Trinity over Warrington, resulted in relegation for the Reds.

The 2003 season was spent in the National League 1, where the Reds – remaining as a full-time club (most other National League One teams were part-time or amateur clubs) – performed very well, losing only 2 games all season. Salford won 90–8 at Gateshead, their highest score since 1907 and then four days later Salford beat Gateshead again 100–12 in the National Cup at the Willows, a club record score. On their way to finishing top of the National League 1 table, Salford also won the Arriva Trains Cup beating Leigh in the final. Having finished on top of the National League One table, Salford entered the National League One play-offs, needing to win their match to qualify for the final. They beat Leigh in a bad-tempered match, to qualify for the National League One Grand Final. Leigh were forced into a knock-out semi-final to try to get through to the Grand Final – a play-off match they ultimately won.

Salford City Reds then comfortably beat Leigh in the Grand Final, to gain promotion to Super League after one season out. It was the sixth time out of seven meetings between the two that Salford had beaten Leigh that season (the first match ended in a draw). Leigh would follow Salford into Super League the following season. 2004 was a consolidatory season for the Reds, notably mostly for an impressive home win over St. Helens and coming from 12 points behind Castleford in a game three times in the season to win all three games, the third of which – at Castleford's "The Jungle" ground confirmed Salford's survival in the Super League and practically relegated 'Cas' in the process. In the end the Reds finished 9th.

The 2005 season saw Salford Reds sign Luke Robinson and David Hodgson from Wigan, both of whom performed excellently well for the Reds all season. Although Salford were unable to improve on the 9th-place finish of the previous season, they were regarded as one of the most improved teams in Super League and finished 6-points higher than they had the season before. However, relegation was again a real threat, as – to accommodate Catalans Dragons from France into Super League in 2006 – two clubs were relegated in 2005 instead of just one. Leigh comfortably finished bottom of the table, losing 14 games in a row. Widnes were also relegated, 6-points behind the Reds.

The 2006 Season started with wins at Warrington, and against Catalans Dragons at the Willows. Further wins over Wigan and Wakefield Trinity meant that Salford had won 4 of their opening 5 games (losing to Bradford in round 3). Salford in SLXI lost eight games by fewer than 6 points, including 1 point defeats to Leeds, Hull F.C. and Harlequins RL and 2 point defeats to Leeds and St. Helens. However, Salford's victory over Castleford on 10 September 2006, ensured that they would play in the Super League play-offs for the first time in their history in a season they had started as favourites for relegation according to most pundits. It is the club's highest position in a top division since coming fourth in 1979–80 in the old First Division. In their first-ever Super League play-off match, Salford City Reds were routed 52–6 at Odsal Stadium against Bradford on Saturday 23 September 2006.

Karl Harrison was sacked as first-team coach on 22 May 2007 following a disastrous run of form that saw the Reds win just three games and draw another in the opening 16 rounds of the 2007 Season, and left them languishing at the bottom of the League Table with a meagre 7 points. Team Director of Football, Steve Simms took over in a caretaker role for two games, winning the first against an in-form Huddersfield and only losing by a single point against then World Champions, St. Helens.

On 11 June 2007 long-term favourite to take the role, Shaun McRae was announced as the new head coach. On 15 June 2007, Salford beat Harlequins 5–2 in the first (and, to date, only) Super League game not to contain a try. On 2 September 2007, Salford were relegated from Super League when Hull Kingston Rovers beat Hull F.C. 42–6.

Super League licence era and move to Barton
McRae led the Salford side to triple success in the National League, winning the Northern Rail Cup, the League Leaders' Trophy and the Grand Final. Salford City Reds were awarded a three-year Super League licence in July 2008 as the game moved away from automatic promotion and relegation.

The Reds beat Leeds at Headingley 30–20 in 2009 to produce one of the biggest surprises of the season. Salford had only defeated Leeds away twice since 1946, the last occasion being 1977.

Shaun McRae was off ill with an undisclosed illness for most of the 2011 season, assistant coach Phil Veivers was caretaker manager and was promoted to head coach in November 2011.

The Reds were awarded a three-year licence to compete in the Super League from 2012 to 2014. They finished the 2011 Super League XVI season in 11th place.

In 2012, the club left the Willows to move into the new Salford City Stadium at Barton, Eccles. Their first league match at the new stadium was on 4 February 2012 against Castleford, who beat Reds 10–24. They finished the 2012 Super League XVII season in 11th place again.

In January 2013, the hearing of a winding-up petition over money Salford owed to HM Revenue and Customs and to players in unpaid wages was adjourned for four weeks so that new investors in the club could be sought. It was indicated that the club could be taken over by Marwan Koukash. On 31 January 2013 it was confirmed that Koukash would take over the club. Phil Veivers was sacked as coach in March 2013 after Salford lost four of their first five games, with Alan Hunte taking temporary charge until former Bradford, Great Britain and Crusaders coach Brian Noble was revealed as the new coach.

2013–Present: Salford Red Devils
Salford signed eight more players and relaunched as Red Devils on 5 September 2013, including former Castleford star halfback and international Rangi Chase, and fellow England player Gareth Hock. The former Warrington captain Adrian Morley, ex-Wakefield Trinity's Tim Smith, and Samoa internationals Francis Meli and Tony Puletua, both formerly of St. Helens, complete the signings from Super League teams. Signings from the Australian NRL were the former Parramatta Eels fullback Jake Mullaney, ex-Melbourne Storm centre Junior Sa'u and Steve Rapira, previously of New Zealand Warriors. Also signed were former Salford Academy product, Jason Walton and Greg Johnson, both from Championship side Batley.

It was confirmed in early April 2014 that Iestyn Harris, a former assistant coach at rival Super League club Wigan, would become the new head coach of Salford. Owner Marwan Koukash had been in talks with Wigan to negotiate bringing Harris to the AJ Bell Stadium but did not state his prospective role to the public. Former Salford Head Coach Brian Noble has been offered the job of Director of Football after being dismissed from his position as head coach after a mediocre start to his first full season in charge.

In 2014, it was revealed that Salford mayor Ian Stewart lent almost £200,000 to the club to keep them afloat, without consulting others at the council. Salford City Council also part-own the stadium where the club play.

In September 2015, four players, Rangi Chase, captain Harrison Hansen, Cory Paterson and Théo Fages, were released by the club by new Director of Rugby and Australian national team coach Tim Sheens.

In 2015, Salford failed to finish in the top 8 of Super League and ended up in The Qualifiers. In 2015, they finished 3rd in the table and secured Super League status for the 2016 season.

In 2016, Salford managed enough wins to finish in the top 8 of Super League, but breaches of the Salary Cap in 2014 and 2015 saw them deducted 6 points and the finished the season 10th and they were placed in The Qualifiers again. Here, they suffered numerous losses, including to the London Broncos and Leigh Centurions, who had both been in the Championship that season and could only finish 5th in the Qualifiers table. This meant they ended up in the 2016 Million Pound Game away to Hull Kingston Rovers. Despite not being in front in the entire 80 minutes, Salford scored two unconverted tries in the last 90 seconds of normal time to take the game to Golden Point extra time. Less than a minute into the extra time, Salford scored a Drop Goal to win the match and secure Super League status for 2017.

In 2018, Salford finished second last in the table and were condemned to play in the 2018 Rugby League Qualifiers.  Salford managed to avoid relegation to the RFL Championship after finishing top of the qualifiers table and secured their place for the 2019 Super League season.

In 2019, Salford reached the 2019 Super League Grand Final after defeating Castleford and Wigan to reach the decider.  Salford were looking to win their first championship since 1976 but faced a St Helens side who had only lost 3 games all season.  Salford would go on to lose the final 23–6 at Old Trafford.

The 2020 season was heavily affected by the ongoing COVID-19 pandemic and, following the departure of the Toronto Wolfpack from Super League, several teams – including Salford – had results annulled. The league campaign was disappointing, but Salford did manage to reach the 2020 Challenge Cup Final, the first time they had reached the Wembley showpiece since the 1968–69 Challenge Cup. Unfortunately for Salford, a late drop goal from Luke Gale won the Challenge Cup for the Leeds Rhinos by 17–16. At the end of the 2020 season, Head Coach, Ian Watson, left the club leaving the Red Devils "surprised and disappointed by [the] decision" in order to take up the role of Head Coach at the Huddersfield Giants.

On 18 December 2020 it was announced that Salford had been fined £15,000 (half of it suspended) for failing to fulfil a fixture v Warrington Wolves in the height of the COVID-19 pandemic; Salford had informed the RFL that they had only 13 players available for selection

Salford finished the 2021 Super League season in 11th place on the table after a disastrous campaign which included an embarrassing loss against Leigh who had lost their previous 16 matches in a row.  On 22 September 2021, Richard Marshall who had only been appointed head coach at the start of the year, left the club by mutual consent.
Salford started the 2022 Super League season poorly winning only three of their first ten matches. After their round 15 loss to Wigan, Salford were sitting 10th place on the table. In round 16, Salford recorded one of the biggest wins in their history defeating Wakefield Trinity 74–10.  The victory started Salford on a winning run as they recorded eight wins in the next eleven games including a 44–12 win over St Helens RFC. Salford would finish the regular season in 6th place and qualify for the playoffs. In the elimination playoff, Salford would upset Huddersfield 28–0. In the semi-final, Salford would lose controversially to St Helens 19–12.  With less than ten minutes remaining, Salford were not awarded a penalty try after it appeared Tommy Makinson took out Salford's Tim Lafai in the act of scoring a try.  Makinson was sin binned for a professional foul and the referee stated he was not convinced Lafai would have grounded the ball.

Colours and badge

Colours

Salford have traditionally played in predominantly red with bits of white. When the club was rebranded as the Red Devils the club colours were changed slightly with black replacing the small amount of white that appears on the home kit.

Badge
Traditionally Salford used the city's coat of arms as many other clubs did until the Super League era started in 1996 and many clubs rebranded. Salford City as they were then known added Reds to their name and a new logo. In 2014 the club rebranded again becoming the Salford Red Devils. In 2017 a new club crest was introduced, the
centrepiece of the new design is the willow tree, symbolising the club's spiritual home and indeed the city – the name Salford was initially derived from Sealhford, meaning a ford by the willow trees. The devil's trident adorns the top of the crest, while there are also five workers bees, included to represent the five industrial communities that grew around the centre of the textile industry in the area. There is a nod to the rivers and canals which were the lifeblood of the region during the industrial revolution and the Lowry Millennium footbridge in Salford Quays. 

This was all scrapped a couple of years later and they just brought the Devil back.

Stadiums

1879–1901: New Barnes
Salford's original ground was at New Barnes (sometimes spelt New Barns) on ground on the north side of Manchester Racecourse.  The club's first game in the Northern Union was played at this ground on 5 September 1896.  In 1901 the club was forced to leave as the ground and racecourse had been purchased by the Manchester Ship Canal company for expansion of the dock area. The last game at New Barnes was on 30 November 1901.

1901–2011: The Willows

They made their debut at the Willows on 21 December 1901, beating Swinton 2–0 in front of 16,981 fans. In the 1960s, the terrace was flattened at the Willows Road end to make way for the Salford Football and Social Club which was officially opened on 16 June 1966. The Willows switched on its floodlights for the first time in the match with Widnes on Friday 11 March 1966. On 26 November 1989, Salford unveiled a new £50,000 electronic scoreboard above the Willows Variety Centre.

2012–Present: AJ Bell Stadium

From the start of the 2012 season, Salford have played at the purpose-built AJ Bell Stadium in Barton-upon-Irwell, co-owned by Peel Holdings and Salford City Council and shared with rugby union side Sale Sharks. In 2015 Salford were in talks with a landowner in Salford about building a new stadium in Salford because of rent low attendances since the current stadium is in Salford, although nothing came from these talks.

Kit sponsors and manufacturers

2023 squad

2023 transfers

Gains

Losses

Players

Notable former players

Team of the Century
In 2001, Salford selected a team consisting of the greatest players to appear for the club since the first game at the Willows in 1901. The team was selected by supporters, board members, sports writers and club historians.

Other notable players
These players have either; played in a Championship, Challenge Cup, or Lancashire County Cup final, or played in Lancashire League winning teams, received a Testimonial match, are Hall Of Fame Inductees, were international representatives before, or after, their time at Salford, or are notable outside of rugby league.

 Jack Anderton 1888 British Isles tourist (RU)
  William "Billy" Banks
Les Bettinson (#4) circa-1965
  David Bishop
Ian Blease (Testimonial match 1996)
 Charlie Bott
Andrew "Andy" Burgess (Testimonial match 1998)
  David Cairns (No. 7)
Colin Dixon (Testimonial match 1979)
  Hugh Duffy (No. F), for Scotland (RU) while at Jed-Forest RFC (RU) 1955 1-cap (signed for Salford 1954–55)
 Harry Eagles 1888 British Isles tourist (RU)
  Tex Evans
 Albert Gear 1937–38 Challenge Cup Final winner, and try scorer
  Harry Goldsmith 1914 final
  Clive Griffiths
  Adrian Hadley
 William Jack Henry Hancock/Jack Hancock/John Hancock (England (RU), Newport RFC)
Warren Jowitt
Mark Lee (Testimonial match 2000)
David Major (Testimonial match 1989)
Stodger Meek (from Bream RUFC)
Frank Miles
  David "Dai" Moses
  Malcolm Price
 Craig Randall 1991–98
  Maurice Richards (Testimonial match 1980)
 Vincent Slater scored the winning try for Lancashire against Middlesex at The Oval on 12 March 1887
  Ferguson Southward circa-1925
  Harold Thomas
 J. Williams circa-1920
 Sam Williams 1888 British Isles tourist (RU)

Past coaches

Seasons

Time spent in each division of the British rugby league system:
1975–81: First Division
1981–83: Second Division
1983–84: First Division
1984–85: Second Division
1985–90: First Division
1990–91: Second Division
1991–95: First Division
1995–96: Second Division
1997–02: Super League
2003: Championship
2004–07: Super League
2008: Championship
2009–present: Super League

Summer era seasons

Honours

League
First Division / Super League:
Winners (6): 1913–14, 1932–33, 1936–37, 1938–39, 1973–74, 1975–76
Runners up (5): 1901–02, 1902–03, 1903–04, 1933–34, 2019
Second Division / Championship:
Winners (5): 1990–91, 1995–96, 1996, 2003, 2008
Runners up (1): 1984–85
RFL Championship Leaders' Shield
Winners (2): 2004, 2008
Lancashire League:
Winners (5): 1932–33, 1933–34, 1934–35, 1936–37, 1938–39

Cups
Challenge Cup:
Winners (1): 1937–38
Runners up (7): 1899–1900, 1901–02, 1902–03, 1905–06, 1938–39, 1968–69, 2020
Lancashire Cup:
Winners (5): 1931–32, 1934–35, 1935–36, 1936–37, 1972–73
Runners up (7): 1929–30, 1938–39, 1973–74, 1974–75, 1975–76, 1988–89, 1990–91
BBC 2 Floodlit Trophy:
Winners (1): 1974–75
Championship Cup:
Winners (2): 2003, 2008

Records

Player records
Most tries in a game: 6 by Frank Miles vs Lees, 5 March 1898
Most goals in a game 14 by Steve Blakeley vs Gateshead Thunder, 23 March 2003
Most points in a game 39 by James "Jim" Lomas vs Liverpool City, 2 February 1907
Most tries in a season: 46 by Keith Fielding, 1973–74
Most goals in a season: 221 by David Watkins, 1972–73
Most points in a season: 493 by David Watkins, 1972–73
Most career goals: 1,241 by David Watkins, 1967–79
Most career tries: 297 by Maurice Richards, 1969–83
Most career points: 2,907 by David Watkins, 1967–79
Most career appearances: 496 (+2 as substitute) by Maurice Richards, 1969–83

Team records
Highest attendance (The Willows): 26,470 vs Warrington, 13 February 1937 (Rugby League Challenge Cup)
Highest attendance (AJ Bell Stadium): 6,891 vs Leeds Rhinos, 16 March 2012
Highest attendance (all time): 97,939 vs Castleford, 17 May 1969 (Challenge Cup Final) at Wembley Stadium
Highest attendance vs an international touring team: 15,761 vs Australia, 21 October 1933 (1933–34 Kangaroo Tour) at The Willows
Biggest victory: 100–12 vs Gateshead Thunder, 23 March 2003
Heaviest defeat: 96–16 vs Bradford Bulls, 25 June 2000

Notes

References

External links

 
 Super League website

 
Sport in the City of Salford
Rugby clubs established in 1873
Super League teams
1873 establishments in England
Rugby league teams in Greater Manchester
English rugby league teams